Events from the year 1980 in Denmark.

Incumbents
 Monarch – Margrethe II
 Prime minister – Anker Jørgensen

Events

Sports
 July 19 – July 3 — Denmark at the 1980 Summer Olympics in Moscow: 2 gold medals, 1 silver medal and 2 bronze medals.

Badminton
 23 March  Lene Køppen wins gold in women's single at the 1980 All England Open Badminton Championships.
 27 May  1 June  Denmark wins four bronze medals at the 1980 IBF World Championships.
 17–20 April — With two gold medals, two silver medals and three bronze medals, Denmark finishes as the best nation at the 7th European Badminton Championships in Groningen, Netherlands.
 Hvidovre BK wins silver at Europe Cup.

Cycling
 Albert Fritz (FRG) and Patrick Sercu (BEL) win the Six Days of Copenhagen sox-day track cycling race.

Births
 1 January – Karina Jacobsgaard, tennis player
 28 February – Christian Poulsen, football player
 25 October – Ditte Jensen, freestyle swimmer

Deaths
 18 April – Poul Kjærholm, furniture designer (born 1929)
 3 September – Dirch Passer, actor (born 1926)

See also
1980 in Danish television

References

 
Years of the 20th century in Denmark